Jubail Church is a 4th-century church building near Jubail,  a city in the Eastern province on the Gulf coast of Saudi Arabia. It is one of the oldest churches in the world. It contains 2 still visible crosses that have been carved into the wall on either side of the middle inner doorway leading from the nave towards the sanctuary.

History
Discovered in 1986, it originally belonged to the Church of the East, a branch of Eastern Christianity in the West Asia. The majority of its adherents are ethnic Assyrians.

Recently, the government has put a fence around the church to prevent potential tourists from seeing it. However, the fences have not stopped locals from coming in to vandalise and damage the building.

See also
List of the oldest churches in the world
Christianity in Saudi Arabia

Notes

External links
Ancient Churches in Saudi Arabia (Crossroads Arabia blog site)
fourth Century Assyrian Church in Saudi Arabia Assyrian International News Agency 2010 (with pictures)

4th-century churches
Churches in Saudi Arabia
Assyrian Church of the East churches
Archaeological sites in Saudi Arabia
1986 archaeological discoveries